Coccothrinax victorini is a palm which is endemic to eastern Cuba.

Henderson and colleagues consider Coccothrinax inaguensis to be a possible conspecific with this species.  If that is the case, the older name, Coccothrinax victorini would replace the better known C. inaguensis.

References

victorini
Trees of Cuba
Plants described in 1939